Metridin (Metridium proteinase A, sea anemone protease A, sea anemone proteinase A) is an enzyme. This enzyme catalyses the following chemical reaction

 Preferential cleavage: Tyr-, Phe-, Leu-; little action on Trp-

This digestive enzyme is isolated from the sea anemone Metridium senile.

References

External links 
 

EC 3.4.21